A list of things named after Vladimir Arnold, a Russian and Soviet mathematician.

Arnold–Givental conjecture
Arnold's cat map
Arnold's rouble problem
Arnold's spectral sequence
Arnold's stability theorem
Arnold conjecture
Arnold diffusion
Arnold invariants
Arnold tongue
Arnold web
Arnold–Beltrami–Childress flow
Kolmogorov–Arnold–Moser theorem
Kolmogorov–Arnold representation theorem
Liouville–Arnold theorem

Other
The 10031 Vladarnolda, minor planet.
 The Arnold Mathematical Journal, published for the first time in 2015, is named after him.

References

Arnold